HMS Curlew was the mercantile sloop Leander, launched at South Shields in 1800. Curlew was a sloop of 16 guns. The Navy sold her in 1810 and she returned to mercantile service as Leander. On her first voyage to the West Indies a French privateer captured her in a single-ship action; she was lost shortly thereafter.

Merchantman Leander
Leander first appeared in Lloyd's Register (LR) in 1801. On 12 April 1801 a gale forced her aground at Torbay while she was on her way from London to Demerara.

HMS Curlew
Between July and 27 September 1803, Curlew was at Deptford being fitted for naval service. Commander James Murrey Northey commissioned her in August for the North Sea.

On 2 April 1804 Curlew, sloop of war, reportedly sailed from the North Seas station with a squadron, and store ships, to Boulogne. Two days later, Curlew recaptured Stert, of Cardiff, William Pettigrew, master. Pettigrew reported, when he reached The Downs, that the privateer that had captured him off Dungeness had that same day taken nine vessels that she had sent to Dunkirk.

Early in the year the Naval Chronicle noted that Curlew was "At present with the North Sea convoy."  During the year Curlew escorted convoys and captured vessels, and performed errands.
 
In 1805 Curlew escorted a convoy to Newfoundland.

Between October 1806 and September 1807, Curlew was at Sheerness, undergoing fitting out. Commander Thomas Young replaced Northey in November 1806, commissioning Curlew for the North Sea.

On 13 October 1807, Abraham Lowe was promoted to Commander into Curlew, an appointment that the Admiralty confirmed. However, the appointment only lasted until December 1807.

Between June 1808 and April 1809, Curlew was at Woolwich, fitting out for the Baltic.< It is not clear where Curlew was or who her commander, if any, was between December 1807 and June 1808.

In April 1809 Tancock assumed command of Curlew on the recommendation of Sir James Saumarez.

Under Tancock's command, Curlew protected British trade to and from Malmo and Gottenburg through the Sound. During this service, her boats captured seven Danish vessels carrying provisions to Norway. Five of these were:

Ingeberg Regina (21 October)
Castrup (same date)
Emanuel (22 October)
Hoffnung (same date)
Sloop, Name unknown (25 October)

Earlier, Curlew had captured, on 14 and 15 October, Hoffnung and Jussrow Margaretha. These two vessels may be Hoffnung and unknown named sloop in the list above.

On 10 November Curlew captured another Danish vessel of unknown name.

Disposal: After Curlew returned from the North Sea she was found to be defective and was paid off. The "Principal Officers and Commissioners of His Majesty's Navy" offered "Curlew Sloop, lying at Sheerness", for sale on 25 June 1810. She sold there on that day.

Leander
Leander returned to mercantile service. Lloyd's Register for 1810 showed her with P. Main, master, Inglis & Co., owner, and trade London–Honduras.

On 1 November 1810 Leander encountered the French 4-gun privateer , of Saint-Malo. An engagement of about a half-hour followed during which men from Speculateur boarded Leander. Captain Main, two mates, and a seaman were killed, and six men were wounded. On Speculateur of her crew of 55 men, one was killed and two wounded. Leander was reportedly taken into Figuerra. A report a week later stated that Leander had been lost on her way into Tréguier, Côtes du Nord. A third report about a month later confirmed that it was Leander that had been captured and lost near Lorient.

Notes, citations, and references
Notes

Citations

References
de Tousard, Louis 
 
 
 
 

1800 ships
Ships built by Temple shipbuilders
Maritime incidents in 1801
Sloops of the Royal Navy
Age of Sail merchant ships of England
Captured ships
Maritime incidents in 1810